This list is for original fictional characters created for adaptations of comic books in other forms of media (television series, films, books, games and advertising).

It includes characters like Firestar and X-23 that were later incorporated into mainstream comics. The category does not include preexisting characters from fiction (books, film, television, etc.) such as Dracula, Conan or Rima that were later incorporated into comics. Characters unique to certain movies and television programs such as Rachel Dawes and Max Shreck are not included on this list because they do not have counterparts in any mainstream comic book.

DC Comics

Apache Chief
Andrea Beaumont
Ethan Bennett
Black Vulcan
Cinderblock
Alex Danvers
John Diggle
El Dorado
Egghead
Nora Fries
Gleek
Gray Ghost
Mercy Graves
Inspector William Henderson
Inque
Isis
Aqualad (Kaldur'ahm)
Livewire
Lock-Up
Lionel Luthor
Más y Menos
Batman (Terry McGinnis)
Renee Montoya
Music Meister
Non
Jimmy Olsen
Harley Quinn
Red X
Roxy Rocket
Samurai
Chloe Sullivan
King Tut
Ursa
Kristin Wells
Wendy and Marvin
Perry White
Wonder Twins
Baby Doll

Marvel Comics

Phil Coulson
Count Duckula
Firestar
Leo Fitz
H.E.R.B.I.E.
Hypnotia
Iceberg
Icemaster
Anna Jarvis
Melinda May
Reptil
Erik Selvig
Jemma Simmons
Spyke
Antoine Triplett
Abraham Whistler
X-23

Other publishers
Cammy
Jessica Priest
Launchpad McQuack

See also 
 :Category:Literary villains
 :Category:DC Animated Universe characters
 Kryptonite

 Originated in other media, List of comics characters